The men's 15 kilometre cross-country skiing competition at the 1968 Winter Olympics in Grenoble, France, was held on Saturday 10 February at Autrans.

Each skier started at half a minute intervals, skiing the entire 15 kilometre course. Gjermund Eggen of Norway was the 1966 World champion and Eero Mäntyranta of Finland was the defending Olympic champion from the 1964 Olympics in Innsbruck, Austria.

Results
Sources:

References

External links
 (International Ski Federation)

Men's cross-country skiing at the 1968 Winter Olympics
Men's 15 kilometre cross-country skiing at the Winter Olympics